The Chudnovsky algorithm is a fast method for calculating the digits of , based on Ramanujan’s  formulae. It was published by the Chudnovsky brothers in 1988.

Algorithm
The algorithm is based on the negated Heegner number , the j-function , and on the following rapidly convergent generalized hypergeometric series:

A detailed proof of this formula can be found here:

For a high performance iterative implementation, this can be simplified to

There are 3 big integer terms (the multinomial term Mq, the linear term Lq, and the exponential term Xq) that make up the series and  equals the constant C divided by the sum of the series, as below:

, where:

,
,
,
.

The terms Mq, Lq, and Xq satisfy the following recurrences and can be computed as such:

The computation of Mq can be further optimized by introducing an additional term Kq as follows:

Note that

 and

This identity is similar to some of Ramanujan's formulas involving , and is an example of a Ramanujan–Sato series.

See also
Borwein's algorithm
Numerical approximations of 
Ramanujan–Sato series

References

Pi algorithms